Avaxıl (also, Avakhyl) is a village and municipality in the Shamakhi Rayon of Azerbaijan.  It has a population of 534. The municipality consists of the villages of Avaxıl and Yusif Məmmədəliyev.

References 

Populated places in Shamakhi District